Andrew Champion (born Andrew Jennati Ataie, June 4, 1970) is an American, East Bay, California vocalist, who sang in such bands as Screw 32, Hopelifter, End of the World, Shadowboxer, Highwire Days, Dance Hall Crashers on two occasions, and most recently, Oh, Ghost Of Mine.

Biography
Growing up in the East Bay straightedge and hardcore community in Danville and Berkeley, he was involved in the San Francisco scene of the eighties prior to the East Bay becoming popular in the mid to late eighties as well. Working as a volunteer in almost every capacity at the Gilman Street Project, Andrew was closely associated with the club. He attended the first show and then regularly for the next ten years. A close friend of Tim Armstrong of Operation Ivy, Andrew would later live with him and Brett Reed at the Adeline Street house just as Screw 32 was becoming popular and Rancid was increasing its base in the early and mid nineties.

His vocal style has been likened to Shawn Brown, Dave Smalley, Dave Vanian, and others with a vibrato singing style while still being straightforward and 'edgy'. Having spent some time in England as a teenager, Andrew was heavily influenced by early eighties and late seventies punk and power-pop music as well as more obvious genres like new wave and rock.

References

1970 births
Living people
People from San Ramon, California
American punk rock singers
21st-century American singers
Dance Hall Crashers members